Trochomorpha carolinae is a species of air-breathing land snail, a terrestrial pulmonate gastropod mollusk in the family Trochomorphidae.

This species is endemic to Micronesia.

References

Fauna of Micronesia
Trochomorphidae
Taxonomy articles created by Polbot